Vladimir Cvetić (born 6 January 1981) is a Serbian former professional basketball player.

Playing career 
A guard, Cvetić played for Belgrade-based clubs Crvena zvezda, Mega Ishrana, and OKK Beograd. On 10 February 2000, Cvetić made his EuroLeague debut with Crvena zvezda in a 96–71 lost to Real Madrid Teka recording one steal in 2 minutes of playing time.

References

External links
 Vladimir Cvetić at eurobasket.com
 Vladimir Cvetic at fibaeurope.com

1981 births
Living people
Basketball players from Belgrade
Guards (basketball)
KK Crvena zvezda players
KK Mega Basket players
OKK Beograd players
Serbian expatriate basketball people in Cyprus
Serbian men's basketball players
Yugoslav men's basketball players